Johnny Helgesen (1 January 1897 – 26 December 1964) was a Norwegian football player for the club FK Kvik. He was born in Halden. He was capped 22 times for Norwegian national team scoring seven goals, and played at the Antwerp Olympics in 1920, where the Norwegian team reached the quarter finals. He died in Halden in 1964.

References

External links

1897 births
1964 deaths
People from Halden
Norwegian footballers
Kvik Halden FK players
Norway international footballers
Footballers at the 1920 Summer Olympics
Olympic footballers of Norway
Association football forwards
Sportspeople from Viken (county)